South Roztocze Landscape Park is a protected area (Landscape Park) in eastern Poland, established in 1989.

The Park is shared between two voivodeships: Lublin Voivodeship and Subcarpathian Voivodeship. Within Lublin Voivodeship it lies in Tomaszów Lubelski County (Gmina Lubycza Królewska). Within Subcarpathian Voivodeship, it lies in Lubaczów County (Gmina Narol).

It covers an area of 208.16 km², of which 167.97 km² is located in the Subcarpathian communes of Horyniec-Zdrój and Narol, and 40.19 km² in the commune of Lubycza Królewska in the Lubelskie Voivodeship.

References 

South Roztocze
Parks in Lublin Voivodeship